Frank Joseph Dewane (born March 9, 1950) is an American prelate of the Roman Catholic Church. He has been serving as bishop of the Diocese of Venice in Florida since 2007.

Biography

Early life and education
Frank Dewane was born on March 9, 1950, in Green Bay, Wisconsin, the third of the four children of Ben and Eleanor Dewane, Irish Catholics who owned and operated a dairy farm. He attended Denmark High School in Denmark, Wisconsin, where he played lineman on the football team, and worked at an appliance factory during his summer vacations to pay for college.

Dewane studied at the University of Wisconsin–Oshkosh in Oshkosh, Wisconsin, from 1968 to 1972, obtaining a bachelor's degree.  He then attended American University in Washington, D.C., from 1973 to 1975, earning a Master of International Administration degree. Dewane worked for the National Broadcasting Company (NBC) in Moscow and then for a subsidiary of PepsiCo in New York City.

Dewane studied philosophy at the University of Notre Dame in Notre Dame, Indiana, from 1983 to 1984, then traveled to Rome in 1984 to attend the Pontifical North American College.  He studied theology at the Pontifical Gregorian University and canon law at the Pontifical University of Saint Thomas Aquinas, both in Rome.

Priestly ministry
Dewane was ordained to the priesthood for the Diocese of Green Bay by Cardinal Adam Maida on July 16, 1988.  Dewane then served as assistant pastor at Ss. Peter and Paul Parish in Green Bay, Wisconsin, until 1991. He worked for the diocesan tribunal as well. In 1991, Dewane was named by the Vatican to its Permanent Observer Mission to the United Nations in New York City.  Dewane entered the service of the Roman Curia upon becoming an official of the Pontifical Council Cor Unum in 1995. From 2001 to 2006, Dewane served as undersecretary of the Pontifical Council for Justice and Peace in Rome. During his tenure as undersecretary, he acted as a Vatican diplomat to numerous international conferences and other events.

Coadjutor Bishop and Bishop of Venice in Florida
On April 25, 2006, Dewane was appointed as coadjutor bishop of the Diocese of Venice by Pope Benedict XVI. He was consecrated on July 25, 3006. by Bishop John Nevins, with Archbishop John Favalora and Diarmuid Martin serving as co-consecrators, in Epiphany Cathedral. He took as his episcopal motto: "Iustitia Pax Gaudium", meaning, "Justice, Peace, and Joy" (Romans 14:17). Dewane succeeded Nevins as the second bishop of Venice on January 19, 2007.

Personal views
Dewane is considered to be moderate in his views, being theologically conservative yet economically and socially progressive. However, he aroused a certain controversy shortly after his nomination as coadjutor bishop when he stated that communion should not be withheld to Catholic politicians who oppose some of the Church's public policy positions.

During the 2008 US presidential election, Dewane stated, "[The] right to life and dignity of every person ... are fundamental to the health of any society and should therefore, be carefully considered when voting for a particular candidate. After all, in voting we are making moral choices." He added, "As Catholics, we are called upon to respect and protect the rights of all, especially, the unborn child, the weakest and most vulnerable among us. At the same time, the family, the basic unit of society, must be safeguarded, promoted, and protected based on monogamous marriage between a man and a woman."

See also

 Catholic Church hierarchy
 Catholic Church in the United States
 Historical list of the Catholic bishops of the United States
 List of Catholic bishops of the United States
 Lists of patriarchs, archbishops, and bishops

References

External links

Diocese of Venice
USCCB Office of Media Relations

Episcopal succession

 

Living people
People from Green Bay, Wisconsin
Roman Catholic Diocese of Green Bay
Roman Catholic bishops of Venice in Florida
21st-century Roman Catholic bishops in the United States
Pontifical North American College alumni
American University alumni
University of Wisconsin–Oshkosh alumni
Catholic University of America alumni
Pontifical Gregorian University alumni
University of Notre Dame alumni
1950 births
Catholics from Wisconsin